Harold Albert Lovatt (18 August 1905 – 1984) was an English footballer. A much-travelled forward, he played for Port Vale, Preston North End, Crewe Alexandra, Bradford City, Wrexham, Scarborough, Leicester City, Notts County, Northampton Town, Macclesfield Town, Stafford Rangers, and Winsford United.

Career
In his youth, Lovatt played for local non-league clubs Wood Lane United, Red Street St Chad's and Audley. In 1923 he joined Port Vale, the next year moving on to Preston North End, but failed to make a league appearances for either club.

In 1925 he joined Crewe Alexandra, scoring 14 goals in 27 Third Division North games. He spent part of 1926 with Bradford City, scoring three goals in 13 Second Division games before joining Welsh club Wrexham, scoring five goals in 11 Third Division North games. He spent the 1927–28 season with Midland League side Scarborough, and became the club's top-scorer with 40 league and cup goals. This record won him a contract with Leicester City, and he scored five goals in four First Division games in the 1928–29 season, including a hat-trick in a 6–1 win over Bolton Wanderers at Filbert Street on 4 May. He scored four goals in five league games in 1929–30, but played just one game in 1930–31 before moving to Notts County in December 1930.

Three goals in nine games at County followed, as he helped the "Magpies" to win the Third Division South title. He moved on once again in 1931, joining Northampton Town. He struck seven times in 14 Third Division South games before he left the Football League to join up with Macclesfield Town, Stafford Rangers and then Winsford United.

Career statistics
Source:

Honours
Notts County
Football League Third Division South: 1930–31

References

1905 births
1984 deaths
English footballers
Association football forwards
Port Vale F.C. players
Preston North End F.C. players
Crewe Alexandra F.C. players
Bradford City A.F.C. players
Wrexham A.F.C. players
Scarborough F.C. players
Leicester City F.C. players
Notts County F.C. players
Northampton Town F.C. players
Macclesfield Town F.C. players
Stafford Rangers F.C. players
Winsford United F.C. players
English Football League players
Midland Football League players